Coastal Grand Mall is  super-regional shopping mall is located in Myrtle Beach, South Carolina located off of US Highway 17 and Harrelson Blvd. and was built in 2004. It is the second largest mall in the state behind the Haywood Mall in Greenville The mall's anchors include Belk, Dillard's, and JCPenney with Dick's Sporting Goods, Bed Bath and Beyond, Old Navy, and Books-A-Million being "junior anchors." There are over 170 specialty stores and a 14 screen Cinemark movie theater located off of the food court. .  It is the newest of two malls in Myrtle Beach, with Myrtle Beach Mall being the elder of the two.

The mall carries a tropical/beach theme throughout, with a boardwalk theme in the food court.  The mall also has an outside entertainment pavilion, which houses various restaurants and stores.  There are also several out-parcels to the mall, including many restaurants and various other stores.

History
The mall which opened in 2004 was constructed under the development of CBL & Associates Properties in partnership with Burroughs and Chapin, who also owned the former Myrtle Square Mall, which closed upon the opening of Coastal Grand.  The mall was designed by the architectural firm MSTSD from Atlanta, GA. The original planned name for the mall was "Mall Of South Carolina." It quickly became the dominant mall in the Myrtle Beach area.

In March 2008, JCPenney opened a new  store. This was the chain's second store in Myrtle Beach, as it continues to operate its older store at Myrtle Beach Mall, but will be closing in April 2020.

In 2019, Dicks Sporting Goods announced it will be relocating to a new wing near Dillard's, it will also receive a Golf Galaxy location as well. The former Dicks building will be occupied by Wilmington-based Flip N Fly Trampoline Park, this will be the second location of the trampoline park chain as they have a location at Mayfaire Town Center (also owned and managed by CBL Properties) in Wilmington, NC.

On July 6, 2020 it was announced that the mall has filed a lawsuit against Bed Bath and Beyond saying that the retailer  owes about $72,000 worth of rent which it hasn't paid in April, May or June. The store occupies more than 25,000 square feet of the mall.

On November 8, 2020, it was announced that Sears would be closing as part of a plan to close 7 stores nationwide. The store closed on January 24, 2021.

References

External links 
Coastal Grand Mall
CBL Properties page for Coastal Grand Mall

Shopping malls in Myrtle Beach, South Carolina
Shopping malls established in 2004
CBL Properties